General elections were held in Malta between 26 and 28 March 1966. The Nationalist Party remained the largest party, winning 28 of the 50 seats.

Electoral system
The elections were held using the single transferable vote system.

Results

References

General elections in Malta
Malta
General
Malta